Benjamin Craig Old (born 13 August 2002) is a New Zealand professional footballer who plays as a attacking midfielder for the Wellington Phoenix in the Australian A-League.

Early life
Old began his sports career as a golfer; he was given his first golf club when he was two. Old was considered a former child golf prodigy, playing in his first international golf tournament at the age of seven. He had travelled to the United States to play against other child prodigies from around the world in Las Vegas, Pinehurst and San Diego.

Club career

Wellington Phoenix
Old originally lived in Auckland before he moved to Wellington and joined the Wellington Phoenix Football Academy in 2018. While not an official member of Wellington Phoenix's senior squad, Old had trained with the team before they went to Australia. Old joined the team again for training when they returned, making his debut as a substitute in the Phoenix's 3–0 win over Western United and nutmegging his defender with his first touch.

Old scored his first goal for the Wellington Phoenix during a 3–0 victory over the Brisbane Roar on 30 March 2022.

International career

New Zealand U-17s
Old was part of the New Zealand U-17 team that won the 2018 OFC U-16 Championship and qualified for 2019 FIFA U-17 World Cup in Brazil. Old played in two games at the World Cup, first coming on as a sub in New Zealand's opening 1–2 loss to Angola before getting a start in the team's 1–0 win over Canada.

New Zealand
Old was named in the 30-man New Zealand squad for the 2022 FIFA World Cup Oceania qualifiers. He subsequently made his international debut on 19 March 2022, coming on as a substitute in the 67th minute during New Zealand's 1–0 victory against Papua New Guinea in the group stage.

Career statistics

References

External links

2002 births
Living people
New Zealand association footballers
Wellington Phoenix FC players
New Zealand Football Championship players
Association football midfielders
A-League Men players
Footballers at the 2020 Summer Olympics
Olympic association footballers of New Zealand